Sleeping Dogs Lie (originally titled Stay and released in the United Kingdom as Sleeping Dogs) is a 2006 American romantic black comedy film written and directed by Bobcat Goldthwait. It stars Melinda Page Hamilton as a woman whose relationships are damaged when she reluctantly reveals that she committed an act of bestiality with her dog while in college.

The film has been cited as a favorite by filmmaker John Waters, who presented it as his annual selection at the 2007 Maryland Film Festival.

Plot
In college, 18-year-old Amy impulsively gave her dog, Rufus, oral sex. Eight years later, she lives a seemingly ordinary life as a schoolteacher and is engaged to nice-guy John. When John suggests complete honesty, Amy lies and tells him that she had a lesbian experience with her best friend Linda. On a trip to her parents' house, Amy finally relents to John's badgering and tells him. The next morning, Dougie, Amy's drug addict brother who had overheard the conversation, spills the beans at the breakfast table and, much to her parents' shock, Amy admits that he is right. Amy and John leave as her father will not speak to her and her mother says that she is ashamed.

Once back, Amy and John's relationship is strained. Despite all their attempts to fix things, one night while drunk, John calls her a "dog-blowing cunt" and Amy decides to leave. She shacks up with Linda and her boyfriend Carl, but leaves due to their noisy lovemaking. With the help of her co-worker Ed, Amy finds a new apartment and begins a relationship with Ed after he learns that his wife has been cheating on him.

After Amy's mother dies of an aneurysm, Amy returns home and reconciles with her father, who gives her a letter her mother had written her prior to her death. Amy and Ed visit Dougie in prison to inform him of their mother's death. He instantly begins to blame Amy, who leaves quickly before Ed can figure out what Dougie is trying to say. Some time later, Ed and his wife are trying to work things out and Amy realizes her feelings for Ed. As it doesn't work out between Ed and his wife, he and Amy become a couple. Ed thinks he's discovered Amy's secret: she was pregnant and engaged to John, but got an abortion and her parents were incensed. Amy decides to go with the lie, thus "letting sleeping dogs lie."

Cast

Reception
The review aggregator website Rotten Tomatoes reported a 63% approval rating with an average rating of 6.2/10 based on 52 reviews. The website's consensus reads, "Though Sleeping Dogs Lie treats its subject and characters humanely, it's unable to overcome the low-budget production and Bobcat Goldthwait's pedestrian directing."

References

External links
 
 
 Interview with Bobcat Goldthwait

2006 films
2006 romantic comedy films
American black comedy films
American romantic comedy films
Films directed by Bobcat Goldthwait
Films with screenplays by Bobcat Goldthwait
Films shot in Los Angeles
American independent films
Zoophilia in culture
Roadside Attractions films
2000s English-language films
2000s American films